Serjania brevipes is a species of plant in the family Sapindaceae. It is endemic to Ecuador.

References

Endangered plants
Flora of Ecuador
brevipes
Taxonomy articles created by Polbot